Hershey's may refer to:

 The Hershey Company, the chocolate manufacturer, commonly called Hershey's
 Hershey's Ice Cream or Hershey Creamery Company
 Hershey's Chocolate World, several visitor centers which started in Hershey, Pennsylvania, US

See also
 List of products manufactured by The Hershey Company
 Hershey (disambiguation)